Thikri tehsil is a fourth-order administrative and revenue division, a subdivision of third-order administrative and revenue division of Barwani district of Madhya Pradesh.

Geography
Thikri tehsil has an area of 575.64 sq kilometers. It is bounded by Dhar district in the northwest and north, Khargone district in the northeast, east and southeast, Rajpur tehsil in the south and Anjad tehsil in the southwest and west.

See also 
Barwani district

Citations

External links

Tehsils of Madhya Pradesh
Barwani district